Syair (Jawi: شعير) is a form of traditional Malay (also subsequently modern Indonesian and Malaysian) poetry that is made up of four-line stanzas or quatrains. The syair can be a narrative poem, a didactic poem, a poem used to convey ideas on religion or philosophy, or even one to describe a historical event.

In contrast to pantun form, the syair conveys a continuous idea from one stanza to the next, maintains a unity of ideas from the first line to the last line in each stanza, and each stanza is rhymed a-a-a-a-a. Syair is sung in set rhythms that differ from syair to syair. The recitation of syair can be accompanied by music or not.

Etymology
The word syair is derived from the Arabic word shi’r, a term that covers all genres of Arabic/Islamic poetry. However, the Malay form which goes by the name syair is somewhat different and not modeled on Arabic poetry or on any of the genres of Perso-Arab poetry.

History
The earliest known record of syair is from the work of Hamzah Fansuri, a famous Malay poet in the 17th century.

The most famous syair is a 1847 poem by Raja Pengiran Indera Mahkota Shahbandar: Syair Rakis. It is considered to be the passage to modern Malaysian literature and mourns the loss of Labuan.

References

External links

 
Malay-language poems